Disengagement (Désengagement) is a film directed by Amos Gitai, starring Juliette Binoche, with Jeanne Moreau in a supporting role. The film is a French/Italian/Israeli co-production, and was shot in France, Germany and Israel. It is the third film of Gitai's "Border" or "Frontier" trilogy.

The film premiered at the 2007 Venice Film Festival in an out-of-competition slot. Following this the picture played at the 2007 Toronto International Film Festival.

Synopsis 
Following the death of her father, Ana (Binoche) and her adopted brother Uli (Liron Levo) meet in Avignon. It is stated in her father's will that Ana cannot receive her inheritance until she has found the child she abandoned as a teenager. This journey leads her to Gaza during the 2005 Israeli disengagement, a time fraught with danger and uncertainty.

Cast 
 Juliette Binoche as Ana
 Liron Levo as Uli
 Jeanne Moreau as Françoise
 Barbara Hendricks as Barbara
 Dana Ivgy as Dana
 Hiam Abbass as Hiam
 Tomer Russo as Tomer
 Israel Katorza as Israel
 Yussuf Abu-Warda as Youssef
 Uri Klauzner as Uri
 Amos Gitai

Critical reception
The film received largely positive reviews from Variety and Screen International.

References

External links
 Amos Gitai Official Website - Production listing
 
 Film de Culte - Filming information
 news on Désengagement's Venice selection and set photo

2007 films
2000s English-language films
English-language French films
English-language Israeli films
English-language Italian films
English-language German films
Films directed by Amos Gitai
Films shot in France
Films shot in Germany
Films shot in Israel
French drama films
2000s French-language films
2000s Hebrew-language films
Israeli drama films
Italian drama films
Films shot in Cologne
2007 drama films
2007 multilingual films
2000s French films